Dinesh Lal Yadav (born 2 February 1979), popularly known as Nirahua meaning thereby one who keeps the honour of Sindur (Vermillion, i.e., an abiding and truthful husband, is an Indian actor, singer, producer and politician associated with Bhojpuri-language films. He is among the most successful Bhojpuri actors, with successive five box office successes released in 2015.   He owns the production house Nirahua Entertainment Pvt Ltd. Dinesh Lal Yadav was a contestant on Bigg Boss 6 in 2012.

Nirahua, who belongs to a famous Biraha family of Ghazipur, started his career as a Biraha singer. He made his debut as a singer in the music album Nirahua Satal rahe (2003) which became superhit and gave him early recognition and his screen name "Nirahua". He made his film debut in the Bhojpuri drama Humka Aisa Waisa Na Samjha (2006), and gained more popularity with his roles in Chalat Mushafir Moh Liyo Re (2006), Nirahuwa Rikshaw Wala (2008) and Pratigya (2008). His other works during this period include Parivaar (2008), Rangeela Babu (2009), Nirahua No. 1 (2009), Saat Saheliyan (2010).

In 2012, He worked with Amitabh Bachchan and Jaya Bachchan in his movie Ganga Devi, he also appeared as a contestant in Bigg Boss 6 that year. Nirahua Hindustani (2014), his fiftieth film was a big hit and also made it to the Multiplexes. He also did patriotic films like Patna Se Pakistan (2015) and Border (2018) which are one of the highest grossing Bhojpuri movies of all time. His Nirahua Chalal London (2019) is the first Bhojpuri movie shot in London and outside Indian subcontinent. In 2019, He also made his debut on OTT platforms, by playing the role of police officer in the web series Hero Vardiwala, which was also the first ever web series made in Bhojpuri language.

Early life 
Nirahua was born to Kumar Yadav and Chandrajyoti Yadav. He has a brother, Pravesh Lal Yadav, and a sister, Lalita Yadav.

He spent most of his childhood days in "Belghoria" at 4 no. railway gate (Agarpara) area of Kolkata where his father worked in a factory. He completed his education in the same suburbs of Kolkata.

He comes from a family of famous Biraha folk singers hailing from Ghazipur. Famous Biraha singer Vijay Lal Yadav known as "Biraha Samrat" and writer and lyricist Pyare Lal Yadav (Kaviji) who has penned many songs in Bhojpuri cinema, are his first cousins.

Acting career

Early hits and establishment (2006–2011) 
He started his acting career with the Bhojpuri film Humka Aisa Waisa Na Samjha (Don't think that I'm riff-raff) in 2006 in which he played the role of a boy who fights to make Bhojpuri a recognised language in the state. But his first released movie was Chalat Musafir Moh Liyo Re (The traveller has been ensnared) in which he played the supporting role of a police inspector with Kalpana Patowary and Sunil Chhaila Bihari. His third film was Ho Gail Ba Pyar Odhaniya Waali Se (I have fallen in love with a girl wearing stole, 2007). After this film, he received many offers. His next film Nirahua Rikshawala (2007) became a super hit. After the success of his another film titled Kahan Jaiba Raja Najariya Ladaike (2007), he was an established actor in the industry and had got the title "Jublee Star". His another hit movie in 2008 was Lagal Raha Ae Rajaji. His natural acting style, slim body unlike other Bhojpuri actor those days, and action moves due to his Karate training in his childhood, made him so popular among the audience that even his flop films used to run over three weeks. He also did stage shows in Fiji, Australia and New Zealand in 2007.

He continued giving hits likes Pratigya (2008), Pariwaar (2008), Nirahua No. 1 (2009), Saat Saheliyan (2010), Nirahua Chalal Sasural (2011). In a review of his film Aulaad (2011), Times of India wrote that "Dinesh Lal Yadav has live up his role".

TV debut and high budget films (2012–2018) 
In 2012, he appeared in the Bigg Boss as a contestant. His film Ganga Jamuna Saraswati (2012) earned 1.25 crores in just three weeks which highest by any Bhojpuri movie in those times. He acted with Amitabh Bachchan, Jaya Bachchan and Gulshan Grover in the Bhojpuri film Ganga Devi (2012). His fiftieth project Nirahua Hindustani (2014) reached multiplexes. Another of his hit movies was Patna Se Pakistan. In 2016, he received Uttar Pradesh's highest civilian award "Yash Bharti Samman Award" by the Uttar Pradesh Government for this contribution in Bhojpuri films.

Bam Bam Bol Raha Hai Kashi (2016) was produced by Priyanka Chopra. Nirahua Hindustani 2 won eleven awards at Sabrang Film Awards. His Kashi Amarnath (2018) was another movie that was produced by Priyanka Chopra. Grossing 19 crores, his patriotic film Border (2018) is one of the highest earning Bhojpuri films ever. Nirahua Chalal London (2018) was the first Bhojpuri film to be shot abroad.

OTT debut and other films (2019–present) 
In made his OTT debut in 2019 with Hero Vardiwala, which was the first webseries ever made in Bhojpuri language. He released his first short film Kukkur in 2021 which was based on the plight of elderly people in old-age homes. On 10 December 2021, his film Hum Hain Dulha Hindustani released, which was a Romantic comedy film starring Amrapali Dubey and Madhu Sharma. This was Nirahua's second film that was shot in London after Nirahua Chalal London. On 1 January 2022, he released his next short film Dahar. He played the role of a Launda in his next film "Naach Baiju Naach" which was released in September.

Political career
Nirahua joined politics by becoming a member of the Bharatiya Janata Party in Lucknow on 27 March 2019 in presence of Uttar Pradesh chief minister Yogi Adityanath. On 3 April 2019 he was declared a candidate to contest the 2019 Indian Lok Sabha election from Azamgarh constituency from Bharatiya Janata Party. He unsuccessfully faced Akhilesh Yadav, the former chief minister of Uttar Pradesh. He lost against Akhilesh Yadav by a margin of 259,874 votes.

In 2022 bypolls from Azamgarh constituency, he defeated Samajwadi Party candidate Dharmendra Yadav by a margin of 8,700 votes.

Personal life
He married Mansha Yadav in 2000. He has two sons, Amit Yadav and Aditya Yadav, and a daughter, Aditi Yadav.

Yadav is also rumoured to be simultaneously married to co-star Amrapali Dubey.

Filmography

Films

Short films

Web series

Television

Awards

See also 

 List of Yadavs

Notes

References

External links 
 

Living people
Male actors in Bhojpuri cinema
1979 births
Bigg Boss (Hindi TV series) contestants
People from Ghazipur
Indian actor-politicians
Bharatiya Janata Party politicians from Uttar Pradesh